Kanalkkattu is a 1991 Indian Malayalam-language film directed by Sathyan Anthikad and written by Lohithadas. It stars Mammootty, Murali, Mamukkoya, Jayaram, Urvashi, K. P. A. C. Lalitha, Shari, Oduvil Unnikrishnan, Mohan Raj and Innocent. The movie is remembered for the performance of K. P. A. C. Lalitha.

Synopsis
A local rowdy is forced to attack an honest person, but kills him accidentally. The repentant rowdy now becomes the pillar of strength for the grieving family of the deceased person.

Cast

Mammootty as Nathu Narayanan
Murali as Ramu
Innocent
Jayaram as Benny
Urvashi as Asha
K. P. A. C. Lalitha as Omana
Sankaradi
P. P. Subair
M. S. Thripunithura
Mamukkoya as Moideen
Meena as Benny's mother 
Mohan Raj as Karim Bhai
Oduvil Unnikrishnan as Ayyappan Nair
Paravoor Bharathan
Shari as Ramu's wife
T. P. Madhavan
Beena Antony
Thesni Khan 
Bheeman Raghu as Thomas Kutty

Soundtrack
The music was composed by Johnson and the lyrics were written by Kaithapram.

References

External links
 

1990s Malayalam-language films
Films directed by Sathyan Anthikad
Films with screenplays by A. K. Lohithadas
Films scored by Johnson